Aoupinieta mountpanieae is a species of moth of the family Tortricidae. It is found in New Caledonia in the south-west Pacific.

The wingspan is 20–30 mm. The ground colour of the forewings is cinnamon brown with sparse brown dots, but darker in the distal half. There is a white spot at the end of the median cell. The hindwings are yellowish cream, tinged with orange apically.

Etymology
The species name refers to Mont Panié, the type locality.

References

Moths described in 2013
Archipini
Taxa named by Józef Razowski